Middle Town is a small settlement on the island of St Martin's in the Isles of Scilly, England. There is a campsite between Middle Town and the nearest coast, which is generally to its south.

References

Hamlets in the Isles of Scilly
St Martin's, Isles of Scilly